R.L. Stine's Haunted Lighthouse is a 2003 short 4-D film. It debuted in several United States theme parks, including SeaWorld San Diego and SeaWorld San Antonio. The film was created by Busch Entertainment Corporation and Lookout Entertainment. It is the first 3-D film featured at Busch Gardens Tampa Bay.

The film was shot in 3D using a 5 perforation/70mm format. The effects in the show include water/air jets and seats wired with special effects (buzzers), remote speakers, and other tactile elements. The ending features water cannons mounted under the screen which soak many people in the theater.

Plot
The film tells the story of the ghosts of two children who are cursed to remain forever on a Cape Cod beach and in a 19th-century era lighthouse. After 100 years, they meet two children visiting the beach and take them to the lighthouse, hoping to turn them into ghosts like them.

Cast
 Christopher Lloyd as Cap'n Jack
 Lea Thompson as Peg Van Legge
 Michael McKean as Captain Van Legge
 Bobby Edner as Edgar
 Matt Weinberg as Mike
 Sara Paxton as Ashley
 Daveigh Chase as Annabel
 Rachel Hunter as Rich Widow Feeney
 "Weird Al" Yankovic (cameo) as Waiter

Later appearances
The film had begun shows at the UK theme park Flamingo Land until 2016 when the ride was removed from the park to make way for the hub, an entertainment complex and Go cart track.

Shows formerly located at Busch Gardens Tampa Bay and Busch Gardens Williamsburg were replaced by Pirates 4D in early 2006.

See also
 List of ghost films

References

External links
 
Haunted Lighthouse at the Iwerks Entertainment website

R. L. Stine
2003 films
2003 3D films
2000s adventure films
2003 horror films
2003 short films
American 3D films
American adventure films
American supernatural horror films
American horror short films
3D short films
Amusement park films
Amusement rides introduced in 2003
Amusement rides that closed in 2006
Busch Gardens Tampa Bay
Busch Gardens Williamsburg
American ghost films
SeaWorld San Antonio
SeaWorld San Diego
4D films
Films directed by Joe Dante
Works set in lighthouses
2000s English-language films
2000s American films